Tony Kelly may refer to:

Tony Kelly (politician) (born 1948), Australian politician
Tony Kelly (photographer) (born 1975), Irish photographer
Tony Kelly (footballer, born 1964), English soccer player who played for Wigan Athletic, Stoke City, West Bromwich Albion, Bolton Wanderers, etc.
Tony Kelly (footballer, born 1966), English soccer player with Nigerian descent who played for Stoke City, Bury, Leyton Orient, etc.
Tony Kelly (Australian footballer) (born 1963), Australian rules footballer for Collingwood
Tony Kelly (hurler) (born 1993), Irish hurler for Clare and Ballyea
Tony Kelly (basketball) (1919–1987), American basketball player
Tony Kelly, a deceased character in Fair City

See also
Anthony Kelly (disambiguation)